John Fox (30 August 1921 – 27 September 1999) was a Scotland international rugby union footballer. Fox played as a Prop.

Rugby union career

Amateur career

Fox played for Gala.

Provincial career

Fox played for South in the 1951 South v North match on 10 November. South won the match 18 points to nil.

International career

Fox was capped for  four times in 1952, all of the caps coming in the Five Nations matches.

References

1921 births
1999 deaths
Gala RFC players
Rugby union players from Scottish Borders
Scotland international rugby union players
Scottish rugby union players
South of Scotland District (rugby union) players
Rugby union props